A by-election was held for the New South Wales Legislative Assembly electorate of The Williams on 22 January 1866 because Marshall Burdekin had been appointed Colonial Treasurer in the fourth Cowper ministry. Such ministerial by-elections were usually uncontested however on this occasion a poll was required at both The Williams and West Sydney (John Robertson). Both Robertson and Burdekin were defeated, with the Cowper government falling, replaced by the second Martin ministry.

Dates

Result

Marshall Burdekin was appointed Colonial Treasurer in the fourth Cowper ministry.

See also
 Electoral results for the district of Williams (New South Wales)
 List of New South Wales state by-elections

Notes

References

1866 elections in Australia
New South Wales state by-elections
1860s in New South Wales